Nuclear Blast is a record label and mail order record distributor with subsidiaries in Germany, the United States and Brazil. The label was founded in 1987 by Markus Staiger in Germany. Originally releasing hardcore punk records, the label moved on to releasing albums by thrash metal, melodic death metal, grindcore, industrial metal, power metal and black metal bands, as well as tribute albums. It also distributes and promotes post-hardcore/metalcore labels SharpTone Records: another post-hardcore/metalcore label, Arising Empire, was in Nuclear Blast portfolio until its acquirement by Kontor New Media in 2020.

In October 2018, French independent label Believe Digital acquired a majority stake in Nuclear Blast.

History 
Nuclear Blast was formed in 1987 after founder Markus Staiger traveled throughout the United States for four weeks and saw a gig of his favorite band BL'AST!. The label's first release was a vinyl compilation called Senseless Death (NB 001) featuring US hardcore bands like Attitude, Sacred Denial, Impulse Manslaughter and others.

Swedish band Meshuggah became the first band in the history of Nuclear Blast Records to crack the Billboard 200, landing at number 165 with their 2002 album, Nothing. Meshuggah also became the first Nuclear Blast band to be reviewed in Rolling Stone magazine.

In 2004, Finnish symphonic metal band Nightwish released Once on Nuclear Blast, which rocketed to the top of the charts in multiple countries, including Finland, Germany, Norway, Greece, Sweden, Austria, and more. It became the first release in the company's history to reach number 1 on the German charts. Slayer released the album Repentless in 2015 which went to number 4 on the Billboard 200 making it the highest charting Nuclear Blast release in the United States.

During the 2000s and 2010s, Nuclear Blast signed many veteran thrash metal bands including Slayer, Exodus, Testament, Anthrax, Kreator, Overkill, Sepultura, Destruction, Tankard, Death Angel, and Heathen.

In 2021, Nuclear Blast founder Markus Staiger launched a new record company called Atomic Fire GmbH.

On August 23, 2022, the video game Saints Row was released, which features an in-game radio station that includes Nuclear Blast artists.

Blood Blast Distribution
Blood Blast Distribution is a subsidiary of Nuclear Blast that focuses solely on the distribution of extreme music. The company was founded in 2020 by Bryce Lucien, Jerome Riera, Denis Ladegaillerie and Myriam Silberstein.

See also 
 List of record labels
 List of Nuclear Blast artists

References

External links 
 Nuclear Blast Europe

German independent record labels
Record labels established in 1987
Heavy metal record labels
Hardcore record labels
Death metal record labels
Black metal record labels
Grindcore record labels
IFPI members